In the C++ programming language, the assignment operator, =, is the operator used for assignment. Like most other operators in C++, it can be overloaded.

The copy assignment operator, often just called the "assignment operator", is a special case of assignment operator where the source (right-hand side) and destination (left-hand side) are of the same class type. It is one of the special member functions, which means that a default version of it is generated automatically by the compiler if the programmer does not declare one. The default version performs a memberwise copy, where each member is copied by its own copy assignment operator (which may also be programmer-declared or compiler-generated).

The copy assignment operator differs from the copy constructor in that it must clean up the data members of the assignment's target (and correctly handle self-assignment) whereas the copy constructor assigns values to uninitialized data members.  For example:

My_Array first;           // initialization by default constructor
My_Array second(first);   // initialization by copy constructor
My_Array third = first;   // Also initialization by copy constructor
second = third;           // assignment by copy assignment operator

Return value of overloaded assignment operator

The language permits an overloaded assignment operator to have an arbitrary return type (including void). However, the operator is usually defined to return a reference to the assignee. This is consistent with the behavior of assignment operator for built-in types (returning the assigned value) and allows for using the operator invocation as an expression, for instance in control statements or in chained assignment. Also, the C++ Standard Library requires this behavior for some user-supplied types.

Overloading copy assignment operator

When deep copies of objects have to be made, exception safety should be taken into consideration. One way to achieve this when resource deallocation never fails is:

 Acquire new resources
 Release old resources
 Assign the new resources' handles to the object

class My_Array{
    int* array;
    int count;
public:
    My_Array& operator=(const My_Array& other)
    {
        if (this != &other) { // protect against invalid self-assignment
            // 1: allocate new memory and copy the elements
            int* new_array = new int[other.count];
            std::copy(other.array, other.array + other.count, new_array);

            // 2: deallocate old memory
            delete[] array;

            // 3: assign the new memory to the object
            array = new_array;
            count = other.count;
        }
        // by convention, always return *this
        return *this;
    }
    // ...
};

However, if a no-fail (no-throw) swap function is available for all the member subobjects and the class provides a copy constructor and destructor (which it should do according to the rule of three), the most straightforward way to implement copy assignment is as follows:

public:

    void swap(My_Array & other) // the swap member function (should never fail!)
    {
        // swap all the members (and base subobject, if applicable) with other
        using std::swap; // because of ADL the compiler will use 
        // custom swap for members if it exists
        // falling back to std::swap
        swap(array, other.array);
        swap(count, other.count);
    }

    My_Array & operator = (My_Array other) // note: argument passed by value!
    {
        // swap this with other
        swap(other);

        // by convention, always return *this
        return *this;

        // other is destroyed, releasing the memory
    }

Assignment between different classes

C++ supports assignment between different classes, both via implicit copy constructor and assignment operator, if the destination instance class is the ancestor of the source instance class:
class Ancestor {
public:
    int a;
};

class Descendant : public Ancestor {
public:
    int b;
};

int main()
{
    Descendant d;
    Ancestor a(d);
    Ancestor b(d);
    a = d;
}
Copying from ancestor to descendant objects, which could leave descendant's fields uninitialized, is not permitted.

See also
Operator overloading
Move assignment operator
Rule of three (C++ programming)
Operators in C and C++

References

External links
 The Anatomy of the Assignment Operator, by Richard Gillam

C++
Operators (programming)
Assignment operations